One Day was an eleven-member South Korean band. It was started by Korean musician Park Jin-young. After performing as one group, it was splintered into two separate bands  called 2AM and 2PM respectively.

Formation
A documentary called Hot Blood Men captured the group's rigorous training program. In this documentary, former member Jay Park (Jaebeom) finished at the top spot and received the most fan votes. It also featured the elimination of three trainees from the group: Lee Swichi, Jeong Jinwoon, and Yoon Doo-joon who were all cut. Jinwoon replaced Im Daehun upon the latter's withdrawal. By the end of the training process, One Day had been reduced to an eleven-member group.

Split
The band was then split into a four-member ballad group 2AM and a seven-member hip-hop group 2PM.

2AM, became a four-member boy band and ballad group consisting of 
Jo Kwon
Lee Changmin
Lim Seulong 
Jeong Jinwoon.

2PM, became a seven-member hip hop band formed by JYP Entertainment, consisting of 
Jun. K (formerly known as Junsu)
Nichkhun Buck Horvejkul known as Nichkhun
Ok Taec-yeon known as Taecyeon
Jang Wooyoung known as Wooyoung
Lee Jun-ho known as Junho
Hwang Chan-sung known as Chansung
Park Jae-beom known as Jaebeom

References

South Korean dance music groups
South Korean boy bands
K-pop music groups
JYP Entertainment artists